The Australian Flag Society (AFS) was founded as an advocacy group to argue the case for a referendum and constitutional elevation for the existing flag of Australia.

The website of the AFS states the following aims and objectives:

 Making civics education, vexillogical and other resources available to organisations and the general public and considering all requests for grants of aid and materiel.
 Due recognition of the Australian National Flag and observance of Australian National Flag Day, 3 September.
 Facilitating contact between supporters of the Society to discuss ways to promote the Australian National Flag and Australian patriotism in general.
 Maintaining a general headquarters and preservation of the Society's collection.
 Continuing to add to the body of knowledge through primary research.

Structure

The AFS was as of 2005 unincorporated. It was originally constituted as the Australian Capital Territory branch of the Australian National Flag Association (ANFA). ANFA ACT was founded by Nigel Morris who in 2002 secured federal funding for the distribution of the "Our National Flag ... since 1901" video kit to all primary schools in Australia being described as a "flag lobbyist" by the Canberra Times. However, on 15 July 2003, affiliation with ANFA was severed, and the organisation rebranded.

Under the AFS constitution (adopted 25 October 2008), the National Convenor may admit voting rights members and appoint from among their number officers of the Executive Council. In addition, members of the general public became able to subscribe to the AFS as supporters free of charge.

Campaigns and initiatives

Parliament house centenary flag

On the 18 September 2001 during the centenary of federation the federal member for Hinkler, Paul Neville, would request of the speaker that:

"before it [the flag] becomes too faded or too tattered, [it] be taken down and perhaps offered to a museum or an art gallery as the seminal flag that flew over this building 100 years from the time the first flag was flown?" 

The parliament house centenary flag was subsequently entrusted to the AFS and has been paraded at schools to mark Australian National Flag Day on a tour of the Australian Capital Territory, New South Wales and Queensland.

National defence

The AFS favours a nuclear hedging strategy and acquiring "the ability to make nuclear weapons at short notice and the systems to deliver them in defence of the homeland." They have also proposed appointing "three war time deputy governor generals to inspect the men and women in uniform and develop comprehensive national service, civil defence, internment and continuity of government policies for Australia."

In conjunction with Flag Day 2012, the AFS began an annual flag day charity appeal, making sales of postcards, flag related merchandise and receiving donations towards a gift and bereavement fund for wounded members of the Australian Defence Force.

Civics education

The AFS has proposed 22 August be proclaimed as "Captain Cook Day" to commemorate the date explorer James Cook declared the British claim to Australia.

National language, holiday and flag bill

On 30 April 2009 the AFS released their National Language, Holiday and Flag Bill, as the way forward in response to a petition of certain citizens calling for a parliamentary committee to review the Flags Act 1953 (Cth). It proposes to amend the Commonwealth of Australia Constitution Act 1900 (IMP) by way of modifiable provisions declaring English to be the national language, 26 January in each year to be Australia Day and the existing flag to be the Australian National Flag.

Under the proposed legislative and constitutional refinements, it is envisaged that the Flags Act would remain on the statute books, to provide the construction sheet for the Australian National Flag which would be described in terms of its essential elements in the constitution, thereby settling the question of popular sovereignty in relation to the process for reviewing the design - in whole or in part - with a weighty body of legal opinion against the constitutionality of the current statutory rules in subsections 3(2) & (3), which provide for an instant-runoff for choosing between the existing flag and one or more alternatives, on the basis of universal suffrage. As the device occupying the lower hoist is simply referred to as a "large white Commonwealth Star", the number of points on what is a well recognised heraldic symbol in its own right could be varied by ordinary legislation, according to changes in membership of the Australian Federation, and not by a plebiscite as currently required, which would remove what has been criticised as an "anomalous and costly" impediment.

Opposition to the recognition of other flags

In the lead up to the sesquicentenary of the Eureka Stockade in 2004, the AFS opposed moves to have the Eureka Flag officially recognised under the Flags Act 1953 (Cth).

In 2008 the AFS lobbied members of the Tasmanian parliament for a public inquiry to be held in response to a motion proposed by Denison Labor MHA Lisa Singh to have the Australian Aboriginal Flag stand in Parliament House, Hobart. The AFS is also opposed to "aboriginal treaties, separate elected and constitutional representation."

National treasure quests

In 2013 the AFS announced a worldwide quest and $10,000 reward for information leading to the discovery of the Union Jack which was reportedly hoisted as a second flag at the battle of the Eureka Stockade.

An Australian flag belonging to the 2nd/23rd battalion and flown at Lingkas beach during the battle of Tarakan was discovered after being featured on the promotional logo for the society's proposed Annual Pause for the National Salute. The frayed specimen contains the inscriptions "2nd/23rd"; "26th Brig"; "Tarakan"; "Oboe" and "May 1945" made using a substance "believed to be human blood."

National salute

The AFS has proposed that all schools in Australia pause to recite the words of the national salute as part of the annual Australian National Flag Day commemorations. The national salute was part of Australian school tradition until falling into disuse from the late 1950s. The version used by the AFS reads as follows:

"I fear God,
I love my country,
I honour her Queen,
I salute her flag,
I promise to always obey her laws."

Religion

It is the position of the AFS that the Australian constitution and national flag are both of divine inspiration. They have also proposed proclaiming the Holy Bible as Australia's official national book.

In December 2016 the AFS launched Australian Christian Broadcasting as a news wire service focusing on biblical eschatology and current world events. The Australian Flag Society's Facebook fanpage also features a regular "World War 3 Watch" series and commentary based around the premise that the Biblical end time has arrived.

Publications

Flag Breaking News is an occasional news bulletin published by the Australian Flag Society.

See also
Ausflag
Australian flag debate

Footnotes

External links
Australian Flag Society (archived website)
Facebook page

Political organisations based in Australia
Non-profit organisations based in New South Wales
Organizations established in 2003